Mick Collins (born December 18, 1965) is a musician from Detroit, Michigan.

Biography 
Collins first got exposure to early rock and roll music through his family's record collection. Also, living in Detroit, he was surrounded by Motown records, which provided influence .

Collins first played in a band called the U-Boats in 1981 and then in the Floor Tasters from 1984 to 1985. In 1986, the 20-year-old Collins helped form the seminal garage punk band, The Gories. The band featured Collins on guitar, Dan Kroha (later of the Demolition Doll Rods) on guitar, and Peg O'Neil on the drums. After three albums and five singles the band broke up after a 1992 European tour.

Collins next worked in a basic garage rock band, Blacktop, from 1994 to 1996. After the demise of Blacktop, Collins helped form the King Sound Quartet, which had one single in 1996 and one album, The Get Down Imperative, in 1997.

Collins then focused on another of his projects, the wide-ranging, musically eclectic Dirtbombs. The Dirtbombs had a changing shift of musicians behind Collins on guitar, but since 2004 has had a steady lineup. Throughout, the band has consisted of a 2-drum, 2-bass set-up behind Collins' guitar work.

In addition to the Dirtbombs, Collins has played in the Screws, an eclectic punk band that has released two albums since 1999 and has appeared on several compilations, and the Voltaire Brothers, a funk project that issued a 2002 album, I Sing The Booty Electric.  He's also done solo work (including issuing a split 7-inch vinyl with Lorrette Velvette for the film Wanye County Ramblin''' in which Collins has a role), produced scores of other artists' music (including Andre Williams), DJ's, and does vocals for yet another long-time side project, Man Ray, Man Ray.

Collins was the host of Night Train, a Saturday night show on WDET, Detroit Public Radio. The program featured four thematic "journeys" through music. The first edition premiered on June 3, 2006, and included musical journeys of Motown soul legends Junior Walker & The All-Stars, Jazz artist Joe Williams, 1950s rock 'n roll star Fats Domino, and 1980s Detroit garage band The Hysteric Narcotics. The show was canceled in spring 2007 after WDET scrapped its music programming.

Collins was the producer of the CD "Drop Dead" by Figures of Light, which was recorded in Brooklyn, New York at Mitro's Studios June 2011, featuring fifteen new tracks from the group. It was released on vinyl by Norton Records on November 13, 2011; the remastered CD version was released on May 18, 2012.

Collins is a noted fan and collector of furry comics. The Dirtbombs song "Burnt to Cinders" is "dedicated to furry fandom" and its parent album Horndog Fest'' features artwork by furry artist Joe Rosales.

References

 Tupica, Rich. "Mick Collins' Turn it Down Interview "http://turnit-down.blogspot.com" Retrieved April 7, 2013.

External links
A list of Collins' career highlights

African-American male singer-songwriters
American rock singers
American rock songwriters
20th-century African-American male singers
Living people
1965 births
Singers from Detroit
21st-century African-American male singers
Singer-songwriters from Michigan
Furry fandom people